Savannah Burton is the first out transgender athlete to compete for Canada internationally in team sports. She was named to the Canadian National team in March 2015. Born in Corner Brook, Newfoundland and Labrador.

Career
Burton became a member of the Canadian acting union ACTRA in 2006 and is best known for her roles on Beauty & the Beast on the CW Network and Killjoys on the Syfy network. In 2017 Savannah was selected to be a member of Me to We Canada Future 50 series.

Athletics
Savannah is the first out transgender athlete to compete for Canada internationally in team sports. She was named to the Canadian National Dodgeball team in March 2015.  Savannah also represented Canada at the 2015 World Dodgeball Federation World Championships in Las Vegas, USA finishing in fourth place on the women’s team and again in 2017 as part of team Maple Leaf at the 2017 WDBF World Championships in the prestigious Markham Pan Am Centre in Markham, Ontario, Canada.

References

Transgender sportspeople
People from Corner Brook
Transgender actresses
Canadian LGBT sportspeople
Year of birth missing (living people)
Living people
Dodgeball athletes